Darkchild is a novel by Sydney J. Van Scyoc published in 1982.

Plot summary
Darkchild is a novel in which Darkchild is a clone programmed to use his potent psionic powers to observe other people.

Reception
Colin Greenland reviewed Frost for Imagine magazine, and stated that "It's a grim and tearful story, and for all its imaginative conviction I found it hard going, Van Sycoc is rather too lavish with her characters' misery."

Dave Langford reviewed Darkchild for White Dwarf #56, and stated that "Darkchild succeeds through evocative writing and 'information feed', that unobstructive trickle of data which [...] keeps satisfying your curiosity and at the same time stimulating it with fresh questions concerning the way things are."

Reviews
Review by Faren Miller (1982) in Locus, #259 August 1982
Review by Tom Easton (1983) in Analog Science Fiction/Science Fact, June 1983

References

1982 novels